This is a list of the Serbia national under-21 football team results from 2006 to the present day.

2000s

2006

2007

2008

2009

2010s

2010

2011

2012

2013

2014

2015

2016

2017

2018

External links
 Football Association of Serbia

Results
Serbia national football team results